Pammenes was a Theban general of considerable fame who lived during the 4th century BC. He was connected with Epaminondas by political ties and ties of friendship. When Philip, the future king of Macedonia, was sent as a hostage to Thebes, he was placed under the care of Pammenes. 

In 369 BC, when Megalopolis was founded, there was a concern that the Spartans would attack those engaged in establishing the community, Epaminondas sent Pammenes at the head of 1000 specially picked soldiers to defend the community. 

In 362 BC, some of Megalopolitan colonists were in favour of dissolving the community, and returning to their own lands, and called upon the Mantineans and other Peloponnesians, for aid. The Megalopolitan settlers who opposed the dissolution of their community called for help to the Thebans, who sent Pammenes with 3000 foot soldiers and 300 cavalry to their assistance. With this force Pammenes overcame all resistance, and compelled those who had left Megalopolis to return.

When Artabazus revolted in 356 BC against Artaxerxes III, king of Persia, Pammenes led 5000 Thebans to the aid of Artabazus, and overcame the forces of the king in two great battles. But Artabazus, suspecting that Pammenes was intriguing with his enemies, arrested him and handed him over to his brothers, Oxythras and Dibictus.

Pammenes is spoken of as being greatly addicted to paiderastia. It is difficult to say what degree of credit should be attached to the story, that, while Philip was under the charge of Pammenes, he maintained a homosexual relationship with the young prince.

Notes

References

Ancient Theban generals

Greek LGBT people
Ancient LGBT people
Year of death missing
Ancient Greek generals
4th-century BC Greek people
Theban hegemony
Year of birth unknown